Mering station is a railway station in the municipality of Mering, located in the district of Aichach-Friedberg in Swabia, Germany.

References

Railway stations in Bavaria
Railway stations in Germany opened in 1840
1840 establishments in Bavaria